The Amazonian brown brocket (Mazama nemorivaga), also known as the small brown brocket, is a small species of deer that is almost entirely restricted to South America.

Distribution and habitat
It is known from Panama (in Isla San José of the Pearl Islands only; endemic subspecies M. n. permira), Colombia, Venezuela, Guyana, Suriname, French Guiana, eastern Ecuador, eastern Peru, Brazil and possibly northern Bolivia. However, reports from the latter habitats may actually represent M. gouazoubira.

Breeding
Breeding occurs year-round in some areas, with births tending to be concentrated in the rainy season.

Threats
It is threatened by deforestation and by diseases spread by cattle, but not particularly by hunting.

Taxonomy
It is sympatric with the larger M. americana over much of its range (the latter tends to have significantly higher population densities), and reportedly also with M. gouazoubira in a few areas. It was considered a subspecies of M. gouazoubira, with which it is parapatric, until 2000. Under normal viewing conditions it is not easily distinguished from M. gouazoubira, but unlike M. americana it is gray-brown overall with paler underparts.

References

Mazama (genus)
Mammals of Brazil
Mammals of Colombia
Mammals of Ecuador
Mammals of French Guiana
Mammals of Guyana
Mammals of Central America
Mammals of Peru
Mammals of Suriname
Mammals of Venezuela
Fauna of the Amazon
Mammals described in 1817
Taxa named by Frédéric Cuvier